Cyrtomostoma gigas is a species of ulidiid or picture-winged fly in the genus Cyrtomostoma of the family Tephritidae.

References

Ulidiidae